This was the first edition of the men's doubles tournament.

Mitchell Krueger and Daniel Nguyen won the title, defeating Jarryd Chaplin and Benjamin Mitchell 6–2, 7–5 in the final.

Seeds
The top two seeds receive a bye into the quarterfinals.

Draw

References
Main Draw

Winnipeg National Bank Challenger
Winnipeg Challenger